Mariya Nikolova (born 9 April 1951) is a Bulgarian former swimmer. She competed in three events at the 1968 Summer Olympics.

References

External links
 

1951 births
Living people
Bulgarian female swimmers
Olympic swimmers of Bulgaria
Swimmers at the 1968 Summer Olympics
Sportspeople from Varna, Bulgaria